Márcio May (born 22 May 1972) is a Brazilian road bicycle and track cyclist, who competed in three Summer Olympics (1992, 1996 and 2004) for his native country. He won two bronze medals during his career at the Pan American Games (1995 and 1999). May retired from professional cycling in January 2008. His last race was the Copa América de Ciclismo, in which he rode for the Scott–Marcondes Cesar–São José dos Campos team.

Major results 

1995
 3rd  Team pursuit, Pan American Games
1997
 1st  Overall Tour de Santa Catarina
1998
 1st  Overall Tour de Santa Catarina
1999
 3rd  Time trial, Pan American Games
2000
 2nd  Time trial, Pan American Road Championships
 3rd Overall Tour de Santa Catarina
2001
 2nd Time trial, National Road Championships
2002
 1st Stage 6 Vuelta Ciclista de Chile
 2nd Overall Tour do Rio
1st Stage 3
 2nd Overall Tour de Santa Catarina
1st Prologue
2003
 National Road Championships
2nd Time trial
3rd Road race
 3rd Overall Tour de Santa Catarina
2004
 1st  Overall Tour do Rio
1st Stage 2
2005
 1st  Overall Tour de Santa Catarina
1st Stage 4
 2nd Time trial, National Road Championships
 2nd Overall Volta Ciclística de Porto Alegre
 5th Overall Volta de Ciclismo Internacional do Estado de São Paulo
2006
 1st  Overall Volta do Paraná
1st Stage 1
 9th Overall Tour de Santa Catarina
2007
 1st Stage 1 (TTT) Tour de Santa Catarina
 10th Overall Volta do Paraná

References

External links
 Official website
 Profile

1972 births
Living people
Brazilian male cyclists
Brazilian road racing cyclists
Brazilian track cyclists
Cyclists at the 1992 Summer Olympics
Cyclists at the 1996 Summer Olympics
Cyclists at the 1999 Pan American Games
Cyclists at the 2003 Pan American Games
Cyclists at the 2004 Summer Olympics
Olympic cyclists of Brazil
Vuelta Ciclista de Chile stage winners
Sportspeople from Santa Catarina (state)
Pan American Games medalists in cycling
Pan American Games bronze medalists for Brazil
Medalists at the 1995 Pan American Games
Medalists at the 1999 Pan American Games
21st-century Brazilian people
20th-century Brazilian people